Hongcheon River is a river of South Korea. It is a tributary of the Bukhan River in the Han River system. The principal city is Hongcheon.

With warm waters and tourist attractions, the river is a popular vacationing spot.

References

Rivers of South Korea
Rivers of Gangwon Province, South Korea